Markus Kronthaler (5 April 1967 – 8 July 2006) was an Austrian gendarme and mountaineer.

Kronthaler was born in Kufstein, Tyrol. He was an officer in the alpine section of Austria's Gendarmerie, which he left in 2003 to become a professional climber. Surviving a free fall of 150 meters (450 ft) into snow in January 2006, Kronthaler led a new expedition to Chogolisa and Broad Peak, Pakistan, in May 2006. He died of exhaustion on Broad Peak after reaching the summit on 8 July. His body was left on the mountain.

In the summer of 2007, an Austrian mountaineering team climbed Broad Peak to retrieve Kronthaler's corpse, which was brought to Austria and cremated. This was the highest-ever body recovery from a mountain. His urn was buried in Kufstein.

Expeditions 
 2000: Shishapangma (8013 m), Himalaya, Tibet – Gendarmerie-Mountain Guides-Expedition
 2002: Ama Dablam (6856 m), Himalaya, Nepal
 2004: Muztagata (7546 m), Pamir, China
 2004: Nanga Parbat (8125), Kashmir, Pakistan – „Nanga Parbat - Edelweissexpedition 2004“ 
 2006: Broad Peak (8047 m) and Chogolisa (7665 m), Karakoram, Pakistan

References

External links 
 „Markus Kronthaler lost on Broad Peak“ K2climb.net 
 „Markus Kronthaler lost on Broad Peak“ broadpeak.org

1967 births
2006 deaths
Austrian mountain climbers
Mountaineering deaths
People from Kufstein
Sport deaths in Pakistan